The 2019 Zambia Super League is the 58th season of the Zambia Super League, the top-tier football league in Zambia. Due to the transitional calendar of the CAF competitions in 2018–19, the 20 teams in the league will be divided into two groups of ten teams stream A and stream B, one of teams from the north and one of teams from the south, Nkana leading one and Zesco United heading the other. The teams top two with the most points will qualify for the CAF Champions League then the other two will play the CAF Confederations Cup. The League will return to normal for the 2019–20 season. The league is set to kick off on the 27th of January, A day after the Charity Shield.

Teams
The season will be contested by 20 teams in two groups, the 16 teams which qualified from the 2018 Zambia Super League and four promoted clubs. After the season, only 18 teams will remain in the Super League. The promoted clubs include Circuit City (debut), Mufulira Wanderers (returning after one season), Real Nakonde (returning after one season) and Manchester United Zambia Academy. National Assembly, Nchanga Rangers, Kabwe YSA and New Monze Swallows were relegated from the 2018 Zambia Super League.

Confirmed promoted teams
 Circuit City 
 Mufulira Wanderers
 Maestro United Zambia (name changed from Manchester United Zambia Academy before season started)
 Prison Leopards

Prison Leopards' promotion
Prison Leopards got promoted to the Super League weeks after the 2018 Division One season came to an end which resulted that Real Nakonde be demoted back to Division one the team that was confirmed to have won promotion earlier at the end of the season with a better goal difference but finished level on points with Prison Leopards. Leopards launched complained against their opponents Tazara Express from matchweek 23 to have ineligible players. The match was forfeited and three points plus a three nil scoreline was awarded to Prison Leopards. Tazara Express was hence fined K5000.

League restructuring
The Super League will adopt a new format starting in August 2019. At the end of the transitional season in June the Super League will have a reduced number to 18 as the Association looks to increase competitiveness.

The start of a new league season in August 2019 will also see the start of the National Division One which will have 18 teams just like the top tier and will be a sponsored league. The two bottom teams from each zone of the transitional Super League will be relegated to the National Division One.

For promotion to the Super League after the end of the transitional season in June the four top teams from the zones will face each other in playoffs with the two winners (top teams) qualifying to the Super League while the other two will drop to the National Division one.

The National Division One will have six teams at this point. To make the total number of teams reach 18 the teams that will finish from 2nd to fourth in each zone will be promoted to the National Division one to make it 18 teams.

League tables
In this transitional season, it will be played in two streams A and B. The Stream winners will play-off for the title, the Stream runners-up qualify for CAF Confederation Cup, two clubs will be relegated from each stream while only two clubs will be promoted as the top level league is reduced to 18 clubs for 2020 season.

Stream A

Stream B

Results

Stream A

Stream B

Third place match

Championship final

Top scorers

References

External links
RSSSF

Zambia Super League
Super League
Guinea